Propiolactone may refer to either of two isomeric chemical compounds:

 Alpha-Propiolactone (α-Propiolactone)
 Beta-Propiolactone (β-Propiolactone)